Cartouche, King of Paris or just Cartouche (French: Cartouche, roi de Paris) is a 1950 French historical adventure film directed by Guillaume Radot and starring Roger Pigaut, Renée Devillers and Claire Duhamel. The film's sets were designed by the art director Marcel Magniez. It portrays the eighteenth century highwaymen Louis Dominique Bourguignon, known as Cartouche.

Cast
 Roger Pigaut as Louis Dominique Bourguignon dit Cartouche  
 Renée Devillers as Madame de Parabère  
 Claire Duhamel as Henriette  
 Jean Davy as Le régent Philippe d'Orléans  
 Jacques Castelot as Le duc du Maine  
  as Vénus, la bohémienne  
  as La duchesse du Maine  
 Lucien Nat as M. de Cellamare  
 Pierre Bertin as Monsieur de Boisgreux  
 Pierre Stéphen as Lignières  
 Denis d'Inès as Le fermier général  
 Jean Carmet as Brin d'Amour, un soldat 
 Palau as Anselme Bourguignon 
 René Worms as Le cardinal Dubois  
 Léon Bary as Un officier de cour  
 Sinoël as Le vieux  
 Lucien Blondeau as Le majordome  
 Yves Brainville as Le comte de Horn  
 Marcel Pérès as Le recruteur  
 Albert Michel as L'espion  
 Albert Malbert as Le policier  
 Frédéric Mariotti as Un voleur  
 Jean Clarieux as Un voleur  
 Maurice Régamey as Lafleur, un voleur  
 Jo Dervo as Un voleur  
  as Un voleur  
 Michel Barbey as Simon 
 Alfred Baillou 
 Georges Cahuzac 
 Jacques Cossin 
 Harry-Max 
 Jean-Pierre Lorrain 
 Lévy as Un juif  
 Franck Maurice 
  
 Raymond Pélissier 
 Liliane Robert 
 Marcel Rouzé

See also 
Cartouche (1962)

References

Bibliography 
 Klossner, Michael. The Europe of 1500-1815 on Film and Television: A Worldwide Filmography of Over 2550 Works, 1895 Through 2000. McFarland & Company, 2002.

External links 
 

1950 films
1950s historical adventure films
French historical adventure films
Films set in Paris
Films set in the 18th century
1950s French-language films
Films directed by Guillaume Radot
French black-and-white films
1950s French films